Anthony Allen may refer to:

Sports
Anthony Allen (wide receiver) (born 1959), former professional American football wide receiver
Anthony Allen (running back) (born 1988), professional American & Canadian football running back
Anthony Allen (rugby union) (born 1986), English rugby union player

Others
Anthony Allen (lawyer) (died 1754), English lawyer and antiquary
Anthony Adrian Allen (1913–2010), English entomologist
J Anthony Allen (born 1978), American composer and producer

See also
Tony Allen (disambiguation)
Anthony Allan (disambiguation)
Allen (surname)